ATN Sony TV is a Canadian exempt Category B Hindi language specialty channel owned by Asian Television Network (ATN). It broadcasts programming from SET Asia as well as Canadian content.

ATN Sony TV is a general interest family entertainment channel.  Programming consists of comedies, dramas, reality series, talk shows, lifestyle programs, Bollywood films and more.

Programming
A list of Notable shows airing on ATN Sony TV:
Beyhadh
C.I.D.
Crime Patrol Dial 100
Crime Patrol Satark
Kaun Banega Crorepati Season 9
The Drama Company
Vighnaharta Ganesha
Yeh Un Dinon Ki Baat Hai

History
ATN Sony TV was licensed by the CRTC on November 14, 2012 as South Asian Television Canada Channel 2.  It officially launched on January 21, 2013 as ATN Sony TV.

On March 18, 2019, the CRTC approved Asian Television Network's request to convert ATN Sony from a licensed Category B specialty service to an exempted Discretionary third language service.

References

External links
 
 SET Asia

Digital cable television networks in Canada
Television channels and stations established in 2013
2013 establishments in Ontario
Hindi-language television in Canada